The Mad Aunts Strike Out is a 1971 West German comedy film directed by Franz Josef Gottlieb and starring Rudi Carrell, Ilja Richter, and Mascha Gonska. It is part of a series of cross-dressing comedies inspired by Charley's Aunt and Some Like It Hot.

The film's sets were designed by Eberhard Schröder.

Cast

References

Bibliography

External links 
 

1971 films
1971 comedy films
German comedy films
West German films
1970s German-language films
Films directed by Franz Josef Gottlieb
Gloria Film films
Cross-dressing in film
1970s German films